Colonial Village is a historic garden apartment complex located at Arlington County, Virginia, United States.  It contains 226 contributing buildings built in four stages between 1935 and 1940.  The buildings hold approximately 1,055 apartments. The brick Colonial Revival-style buildings are situated around courtyards with clusters of five and seven buildings to larger groupings of up to thirteen.  Colonial Village was the first Federal Housing Administration-insured, large-scale, rental housing project erected in the United States. The complex has been converted to condominiums split into three phases (Colonial Village I, Colonial Village II, and Colonial Village III) and two apartment complexes: Colonial Village Apartments and Colonial Village West.

The Arlington County Board designated the garden apartment complex  to be a local historic district on December 5, 1978.  The National Park Service listed the Village on the National Register of Historic Places on December 9, 1990.

See also
 List of Arlington County Historic Districts

References

External links
Website for Colonial Village I: A Condominium
Website for Colonial Village II: A Condominium
Website for Colonial Village III: A Condominium
Website for Colonial Village Apartments: Wesley Housing Development Corporation
Website for Colonial Village West: Apartment Homes

Neighborhoods in Arlington County, Virginia
Residential buildings on the National Register of Historic Places in Virginia
Arlington County Historic Districts
Colonial Revival architecture in Virginia
Residential buildings completed in 1940
National Register of Historic Places in Arlington County, Virginia
1935 establishments in Virginia